Dennis E. Stowell (June 18, 1944 – April 17, 2011) was an American politician and chemical engineer from Utah. A Republican, he was a member of the Utah State Senate, representing the state's 28th senate district in Beaver, Garfield, Iron, Kane, Millard, and Washington Counties.

Stowell earned bachelor's and master's degrees in chemical engineering from Brigham Young University. He also served as Mayor of Parowan, Utah.

References
 

1944 births
2011 deaths
American Latter Day Saints
Brigham Young University alumni
Mayors of places in Utah
Republican Party Utah state senators
American chemical engineers
People from Parowan, Utah
Politicians from Ogden, Utah
21st-century American politicians